This is a list of the members of the 18th Seanad Éireann, the upper house of the Oireachtas (legislature) of Ireland.  These Senators were elected or appointed in 1987, after the 1987 general election and served until the close of poll for the 19th Seanad in 1989.

Composition of the 18th Seanad 
There are a total of 60 seats in the Seanad. 43 Senators are elected by the Vocational panels, 6 elected by the Universities and 11 are nominated by the Taoiseach.

The following table shows the composition by party when the 18th Seanad first met on 25 April 1987.

List of senators

Changes

See also 
Members of the 25th Dáil
Government of the 25th Dáil

References

External links 

 
18